Humasyouhitch/SonOfaBitch is the debut studio album by English singer-songwriter Cosmo Jarvis, that was released on November 16, 2009. The album's first single "She's Got You" was released on September 6, 2009. Following this, "Problems" and "You Got Your Head" were both released on November 1, 2009.

Track listing

References

External links
 

2009 albums
Wall of Sound (record label) albums
Cosmo Jarvis albums